Bazley or Bazley Beach is a residential beach town along the KwaZulu-Natal South Coast, south of Durban.

It was named after John Bazley, an engineer and Byrne Settler whose son William successfully opened the Mzimkulu River mouth for shipping in the 1880s, at the place now known as Port Shepstone. John Bazley first arrived in the area in 1859 and set up camp on the banks of the Ifafa River. After a fairly good start, his farming activities grew and he was granted(by who????) of land for sugar farming. He worked hard and prospered. Within two years, he had established a sugar mill.

Today, Bazley is a quiet and tranquil cove for lazy days on the beach and destressing. It is only accessible from the Sezela motorway turn-off.

References

Denzil Bazley.  Nil Desperandum, the Bazley Story. The Royle Trust. 2000

Populated places in the Umdoni Local Municipality
Populated coastal places in South Africa
KwaZulu-Natal South Coast